Season Two of Dana White's Contender Series commenced on June 12, 2018.

Week 1 - June 12

Contract awards 
The following fighters were awarded contracts with the UFC:
Alonzo Menifield and Greg Hardy

Week 2 - June 19

Contract awards 
The following fighters were awarded contracts with the UFC:
Matt Sayles, Anthony Hernandez, Ryan Spann, and Dwight Grant

Week 3 - June 26

Contract awards 
The following fighters were awarded contracts with the UFC:
Antonina Shevchenko and Te'Jovan Edwards

Week 4 - July 10

Contract awards 
The following fighters were awarded contracts with the UFC:
Bevon Lewis and Jordan Espinosa

Week 5 - July 17

Contract awards 
The following fighters were awarded contracts with the UFC:
Maycee Barber, Domingo Pilarte, and Edmen Shahbazyan

Week 6 - July 24

Contract awards 
The following fighters were awarded contracts with the UFC:
Jimmy Crute, Sodiq Yusuff, and Jeff Hughes
Chase Hooper was signed to a development league contract

Week 7 - July 31

Contract awards 
The following fighters were awarded contracts with the UFC:
Roosevelt Roberts, Ian Heinisch, Jordan Griffin, and Juan Adams

Week 8 - August 7

Contract awards 
The following fighters were awarded contracts with the UFC:
Devonte Smith, Kennedy Nzechukwu, and Bobby Moffett

References

Ultimate Fighting Championship television series